The 1988/89 FIS Nordic Combined World Cup was the sixth World Cup season, a combination of ski jumping and cross-country skiing organized by International Ski Federation. It started on 17 Dec 1988 in Saalfelden, Austria and ended on 25 March 1989 in Thunder Bay, Canada.

Calendar

Men

Standings

Overall 

Standings after 9 events.

Nations Cup 

Standings after 9 events.

References

External links
FIS Nordic Combined World Cup 1988/89 

1988 in Nordic combined
1989 in Nordic combined
FIS Nordic Combined World Cup